Valerie Elizabeth Desmore (1925 — 14 August 2008) was a South African artist and designer, based in London.

Early life
Valerie Desmore was born in Cape Town, South Africa. Her parents were teachers; her father, Abe J. B. Desmore, was a "leading Coloured intellectual" who held a master's degree in education from the Teachers College, Columbia University. Facing limited opportunities for further education, she left South Africa for London in 1946, to study at the Slade School of Fine Art. After leaving the Slade, she studied in Vienna with Oskar Kokoschka.

Career
While she was a teenager, in 1943, Desmore had a public exhibition of her art at the Herbert Stanley Argus Gallery, which was very likely the first such show by a woman artist classified as "coloured" in Cape Town.  In 1951, she began to study fashion design, and produced several collections in the 1960s. She opened a shop in Covent Garden in 1978, and designed clothing for Marks and Spencer for eighteen years, while still painting in her spare time.

She returned to South Africa to visit in 1997, when her work was featured in an exhibit called Land and Lives curated by Elza Miles.

Legacy
Desmore died in London in 2008. In 2012, curator Nontobeko Ntombela produced an exhibition at the Johannesburg Art Gallery, called A Fragile Archive, featuring the works of Gladys Mgudlandlu and Desmore.

References

1925 births
2008 deaths
Alumni of the Slade School of Fine Art
British fashion designers
British women fashion designers
South African artists
South African emigrants to the United Kingdom
South African fashion designers
South African women fashion designers